The Santa Barbara County Courthouse is a Spanish Colonial Revival style building designed by William Mooser III and completed in 1929. Architect Charles Willard Moore called it the "grandest Spanish Colonial Revival structure ever built," and the prime example of Santa Barbara's adoption of Spanish Colonial as its civic style.

Located at 1100 Anacapa Street, in downtown Santa Barbara, California.  the building replaced a smaller Greek Revival courthouse built there in 1872–88 and badly damaged in an earthquake on June 29, 1925.  The complex was designated a National Historic Landmark in 2005 for its architecture.

Description

The courthouse is composed of four buildings, totaling . It includes a Jail Wing, which is no longer used to hold prisoners.  Visitors may take elevators to the summit of the  "El Mirador" clock tower, which has labeled photographs that show what the viewer is looking at in all directions.

Currently, the Santa Barbara County Courthouse is undergoing several restoration projects in the various wings, and just finished restoring the disintegrating fountain in the front. In the past two years $150,000 was spent in maintenance and improvements.

Occupying an entire city block, the grounds contain a collection of palms and specimen trees from more than 25 countries. The courthouse hosts many events, particularly at the Sunken Garden, site of the 1872 courthouse. As of 2015, almost 7,000 visitors from 60 countries came to visit in the past year.

Façade
The main entrance to the courthouse features a large façade depicting two enthroned figures; between the figures is an inscription of a Spanish translation of a quote from Marcus Terentius Varro. The equivalent English translation is found on the right door to the right.

Gallery

See also
 History of Santa Barbara, California
California Historical Landmarks in Santa Barbara County, California

References

Further reading
Patricia Gebhard and Kathryn Masson, Santa Barbara County Courthouse. Photos by Daniel Chen.  2001, Daniel & Daniel, Santa Barbara.

External links

The Historic Santa Barbara County Courthouse. Superior Court of California: Santa Barbara County
Santa Barbara County Courthouse Official Website
Visiting the Court House
View of the Anacapa Arch at the Santa Barbara County Courthouse, Santa Barbara, California, 1929. Los Angeles Times Photographic Archive (Collection 1429). UCLA Library Special Collections, Charles E. Young Research Library, University of California, Los Angeles.
Image of the Santa Barbara County Courthouse under construction, Santa Barbara, California. Los Angeles Times Photographic Archive (Collection 1429). UCLA Library Special Collections, Charles E. Young Research Library, University of California, Los Angeles.

County courthouses in California
Buildings and structures in Santa Barbara, California
Government buildings completed in 1926
California Historical Landmarks
National Historic Landmarks in California
Courthouses on the National Register of Historic Places in California
National Register of Historic Places in Santa Barbara County, California
1926 establishments in California
Tourist attractions in Santa Barbara, California
Mediterranean Revival architecture in California
Mission Revival architecture in California
Spanish Colonial Revival architecture in California